Wolong Temple (Chinese: 卧龙寺) is located on Baishulin St., Beilin District, Xi'an, Shaanxi Province of China. According to the stele in the temple, it was built during Lingdi's reign (AD 168–189), Han dynasty, more than 1,800 years ago. It was called "Fu Ying Chan Yuan"() during the Sui dynasty. The temple kept a painting of Guanyin drawn by Wu Daozi in the Tang dynasty, so it was also called "Guanyin Temple". It was renamed Wolong Temple during Taizong's reign of (976–997), Song dynasty.

Buildings and structures in Xi'an
Buddhist temples in Xi'an